Dibamus nicobaricum is a species of lizard found in the Nicobar Islands of India.

Description
The snout of this lizard is conical, obtuse, and slightly projecting. It has four enlarged shields on the head besides the rostral and labial scales - a frontal, an interparietal, and an ocular on each side; the interparietal shield is the largest. The eyes are scarcely distinguishable through the ocular scale. It has a narrow, elongate, trapezoidal mental, and a very large sublabial on each side. Scales equal, 22 to 26 round the middle of the body. The preanal scales very small.  Its tail is very short and obtuse. Its body is a uniform purplish-brown color.

Total body and tail length is five to eight inches.

Distribution
D. nicobaricum is found on Great Nicobar Island, and probably Little Nicobar Island. The type locality is given as "Nicobar Islands".

Notes

References
 Das, I. 1996 The validity of Dibamus nicobaricum (Fitzinger in Steindachner, 1867) (Squamata: Sauria: Dibamidae). Russ. J. Herpetol. 3 (2): 157-162
 Das, I. 1999 Biogeography of the amphibians and reptiles of the Andaman and Nicobar Islands, India. In: Ota,H. (ed) Tropical Island herpetofauna.., Elsevier, pp. 43–77
 Diaz, R.E., M.T. Leong, L.L. Grismer & N.S. Yaakob 2004 A new species of Dibamus (Squamata: Dibamidae) from West Malaysia. Asiatic Herpetological Research 10: 1-7
 Stoliczka,F. 1873 Notes on some Andamese and Nicobarese Reptiles, with the descriptions of three new species of lizards. J. Asiat. Soc. Bengal  42: 162-169

External links
 

Dibamus
Reptiles of India
Endemic fauna of the Nicobar Islands
Reptiles described in 1867